This page details football records in Israel.

National team
See Israel national football team records.

League
Records in this section refer to Palestine League from its founding in 1931 to 1947, Israeli League from 1949 to 1950, Liga Alef from 1951 to 1955, Liga Leumit from 1955 to 1999 and to the Premier League since the 1999 season.

Titles
Most League titles: 23, Maccabi Tel Aviv (1936, 1937, 1941–42, 1946–47, 1949–50, 1951–52, 1953–54, 1955–56, 1957–58, 1966–68, 1969–70, 1971–72, 1976–77, 1978–79, 1991–92, 1994–95, 1995–96, 2002–03, 2012–13, 2013–14, 2014–15, 2018–19, 2019–20)
Most consecutive League titles: 5, Hapoel Petah Tikva (1958–59, 1959–60, 1960–61, 1961–62, 1962–63)

Top-flight Appearances
Most appearances: 70 seasons, Maccabi Tel Aviv (1949–present)
Most consecutive seasons in top-flight: 70 seasons, Maccabi Tel Aviv (1949–present)

Unbeaten runs
Longest unbeaten League run: 48, Maccabi Haifa (Liga Leumit, between 3 April 1993 and 10 October 1994)

Points
Most points in a season:
2 points for a win: 47, Maccabi Netanya (Liga Leumit, 1970–71)
3 points for a win: 95, Maccabi Haifa (Liga Leumit, 1993–94)
Fewest points in a season
2 points for a win: 0, Maccabi Nes Tziona (Israeli League, 1949–50)
3 points for a win: 10, joint record:
Beitar Netanya (Liga Leumit, 1986–87)
Maccabi Jaffa (Liga Leumit, 1998–99)

Team
Most top-flight goals scored in a season: 103, Maccabi Tel Aviv (Israeli League, 1949–50)

Promotion and change in position
Highest finish by a promoted club: 1st, joint record:
 Hapoel Ramat Gan (Liga Leumit, 1963–64)
 Beitar Jerusalem (Liga Leumit, 1992–93)
Lowest finish by the previous season's champions: 16th out of 16 (relegated), Hapoel Kfar Saba (Liga Leumit, 1982–83)

Goals

Individual
Most career league goals: 207, Alon Mizrahi (1989 to 2005)
Most goals in a season: 35, Eran Zahavi (36 matches, for Maccabi Tel Aviv in the (2015–16 Premier League)
Fastest goal: 6 seconds, Ilan Bakhar (for Maccabi Herzliya v. Hapoel Be'er Sheva, 1997–98 Liga Leumit)

Premier League – Since 1999–2000 season

Titles
Most titles: 7, Maccabi Haifa
Most consecutive title wins: 3, joint record:
 Maccabi Haifa (2003–04, 2004–05, 2005–06)
 Maccabi Tel Aviv (2012–13, 2013–14, 2014–15)
 Hapoel Be'er Sheva (2015–16, 2016–17, 2017–18)

Wins
Most wins in a season: 27, Maccabi Tel Aviv (2018–19)
Fewest wins in a season: 3, join record:
Hapoel Petah Tikva (2006–07)
Hapoel Ramat Gan (2010–11)
Most Premier League wins: 340, Maccabi Haifa (1999–present)

Draws
Most draws in a season: 18, Hapoel Haifa (1999–2000)
Fewest draws in a season: 3, Maccabi Tel Aviv (2002–03)
Most Premier League draws: 16, Beitar Jerusalem (1999–present)

Losses
Most losses in a season: 30, Tzafririm Holon (2000–01)
Fewest losses in a season: 1, joint record:
Hapoel Tel Aviv (2009–10)
Maccabi Tel Aviv (2018–19, 2019–20)
Most Premier League losses: 235, F.C. Ashdod (1999–2014, 2015–present)

Premier League Appearances
Most appearances: 20 seasons, joint record:
Beitar Jerusalem (1999–present)
Maccabi Haifa (1999–present)
Maccabi Tel Aviv (1999–present)
Most consecutive seasons in the Premier League: 20 seasons, joint record:
Beitar Jerusalem (1999–present)
Maccabi Haifa (1999–present)
Maccabi Tel Aviv (1999–present)

Points
Most points in a season:
3 points for a win: 89, Maccabi Tel Aviv (2018–19)
Fewest points in a season
3 points for a win: 12, Maccabi Netanya (2015–16)

Promotion and change in position
Highest finish by a promoted club: 3rd, Ironi Kiryat Shmona (2007–08)
Best position for promoted clubs: 3rd and 4th, Ironi Kiryat Shmona and Bnei Sakhnin (2007–08)

Goals
Most goals scored in a season: 87, Hapoel Tel Aviv (2009–10)
Most Premier League goals: 1050, Maccabi Haifa (1999–present)
Fewest goals scored in a season: 14, Maccabi Netanya (2015–16) 
Most goals conceded in a season: 85, Tzafririm Holon (2000–01)
Most Premier League goals conceded: 808, F.C. Ashdod (1999–2014, 2015–present)
Fewest goals conceded in a season: 10, Maccabi Tel Aviv (2019–20)
Best points average in the Premier League: 64.94, Maccabi Haifa (1999–present)
Best goal difference in the Premier League: +469, Maccabi Haifa (1999–present)
Worst goal difference in the Premier League: –130p, Hapoel Petah Tikva (1999–2007, 2008–2012, 2013–2014)

Individual
Most Israeli Premier League goals: 128, Shay Holtzman (1999 to 2009)
Most goals in a season: 35, Eran Zahavi (36 matches), for Maccabi Tel Aviv, (2015-16)

State Cup
Most wins: 24, Maccabi Tel Aviv (1929, 1930, 1933, 1941, 1946, 1947, 1954, 1955, 1958, 1959, 1964, 1965, 1967, 1970, 1977, 1987, 1988, 1994, 1996, 2001, 2002, 2005, 2015, 2021)
Most consecutive wins: 3, Hapoel Tel Aviv (1937, 1938, 1939; 2010, 2011, 2012)
Most appearances: 36, Maccabi Tel Aviv (1929, 1930, 1933, 1934, 1938, 1940, 1941, 1946, 1947, 1952, 1954, 1955, 1958, 1959, 1962, 1964, 1965, 1967, 1970, 1976, 1977, 1979, 1983, 1987, 1988, 1992, 1993, 1994, 1996, 1997, 2001, 2002, 2005, 2015, 2016, 2017)
Biggest win: Beitar Tel Aviv 12–1 Maccabi Haifa (1942)
Most goals in a final: 13, Beitar Tel Aviv 12–1 Maccabi Haifa (1942)
Most goals by a losing side: 3 –
Hapoel Petah Tikva: Lost 3–4 against Maccabi Tel Aviv (1959)
Maccabi Haifa scored 3 times (3–3) but lost on a penalty shootout vs Maccabi Tel Aviv (1987)
Maccabi Haifa scored 3 times (3–3) but lost on a penalty shootout vs Beitar Jerusalem (1989)
Most defeats in a final: 13, Maccabi Tel Aviv (1934, 1938, 1940, 1952, 1962, 1976, 1979, 1983, 1992, 1993, 1997, 2016, 2017)

Toto Cup
Most wins: 7, Maccabi Tel Aviv (1993, 1999, 2009, 2015, 2018, 2019, 2020)
Most consecutive wins: 2, joint record:
 Shimshon Tel Aviv (1987, 1988)
 Hapoel Petah Tikva (1990, 1991)
 Ironi Kiryat Shmona (2011, 2012)
 Maccabi Tel Aviv (2018, 2019)

Most successful clubs overall

The figures in bold represent the most times this competition has been won by an Israeli team.
The teams in italic represent a defunct team.

Managers
Most League title wins: Dror Kashtan, 6 (Hapoel Kfar Saba, Beitar Jerusalem, Maccabi Tel Aviv, Hapoel Tel Aviv)
Most State Cup wins: Dror Kashtan, 6 (Hapoel Lod, Beitar Jerusalem, Maccabi Tel Aviv, Hapoel Tel Aviv)
Most Toto Cup wins: Avram Grant, 5 (Hapoel Petah Tikva, Maccabi Tel Aviv, Maccabi Haifa)
Most Asian Champion Club Tournament wins: Yosef Merimovich, 2 (Hapoel Tel Aviv, Maccabi Tel Aviv)

Player records

Top scorers

Most appearances

Notes

External links

Rec.Sport.Soccer Statistics Foundation 
 List of Final Tables
 List of Champions
 List of Cup Finals

Records
records and statistics
Israel